The Working Class Goes to Heaven (Italian: La classe operaia va in paradiso), released in the US as Lulu the Tool, is a 1971 political drama film directed by Elio Petri. It depicts a factory worker's realisation of his own condition as a simple tool in the process of production and implicitly his struggle with the trade unions.

The film competed at the 1972 Cannes Film Festival, where it tied with The Mattei Affair for the Grand Prix International du Festival, the festival's highest honour. In Italy, it also won the David di Donatello for Best Film.

Plot
Lulu Massa is a highly productive worker at a factory paying piece work but is disliked by his colleagues as his efficiency is used by management  to justify their demands for higher output. While employees are told to care for and rely on their machines, they see radical students outside the factory campaigning for higher pay rates and less work. Lulu lives with Lidia and her son. He puts his lack of interest in sex with her down to the pressures of the job.

Lulu loses a finger in a work accident, which the workers blame on the faster times. Shocked, he adopts the students' analysis and takes strike action to end piece work, against the unions' policy, which is for simply an increase in piece work rates.

Lulu pursues an affair with a female co-worker but finds that having sex with her in an automobile is difficult. Lidia, unhappy with his new far left sympathies, moves out with her son, who cries, but is told that Lulu never really cared for him, and reminded that Lulu would slap him occasionally.

When the employees go back to work, Lulu is fired for promoting the students' extremist views. Lidia and her boy return to the apartment, to find that Lulu has destroyed their inflatable Scrooge McDuck doll. Syndicalists arrive to inform Lulu that they have agreed a deal with the employers on work regulations and won Lulu's job back.

Cast

Production
The film was shot in a factory in Novara, Piedmont, with many of its personnel serving as extras in the film.

Reception
In The New York Times, A.H. Weiler reviewed the film under its U.S. release title Lulu the Tool, calling it "both fascinating and sobering". In Film Quarterly, James Roy MacBean compared The Working Class Goes to Heaven to the prison drama The Brig in a "jarringly abrasive" portrayal of factory work and the quote "The factory is a prison".

Clarke Fountain, for New York, said it rose above the level of a propaganda film, and deserved a place in Elio Petri's canon along with his 1970 Investigation of a Citizen Above Suspicion. However, in 1986 author Mira Liehm referred to it as a "weaker" Petri film, and "heavy-handed". In his 2015 Movie Guide, Leonard Maltin gave it three stars, declaring it a "Superbly directed, thought-provoking critique of capitalism".

Accolades
At Cannes, the film shared the Grand Prix International du Festival, the equivalent of the Palme d'Or of later years, with The Mattei Affair.

References

External links

Cannes profile

1971 films
Films about criticism and refusal of work
Films directed by Elio Petri
Films set in Italy
Films shot in Italy
Films scored by Ennio Morricone
1970s Italian-language films
Palme d'Or winners
1970s political drama films
Italian political drama films
Films with screenplays by Ugo Pirro
Working class in Europe
1971 drama films
Films about labor relations
1970s Italian films